Loveline is the fifth studio album by American country music artist Eddie Rabbitt. It was released in 1979 under the Elektra Records label. The album produced three singles including "Suspicions", which reached number one on country charts, 13 on the Billboard 100 and 9 on the Adult Contemporary chart. The other singles included "Pour Me Another Tequila" and "Gone Too Far", which peaked at 5 and 1, respectively, on Country Charts. The song "I Don't Wanna Make Love (With Anyone But You)" previously appeared on Rabbitt's album Rocky Mountain Music and was re-recorded on this album.

Loveline reached number four on country album charts and received generally positive reviews. Allmusic retrospectively gave the album 3.5 stars out of 5 and praised it for its "R&B influence" and "disco feel" along with the track's "inspired melodies and unusual chord progressions."

The title song was later recorded by Dr. Hook; their version became their last entry on the Billboard Hot 100, reaching No. 60 in 1982.

Track listing

Personnel
Eddie Rabbitt - acoustic guitar, lead vocals, backing vocals
Barry Beckett - keyboards
Dennis Belfield - bass guitar
Larry Byrom - electric guitar
Steve Forman - percussion
Sherry Grooms - background vocals
Michele Gruska - background vocals
Roger Hawkins - drums
David Hood - bass guitar
David Hungate - bass guitar
Jimmy Johnson - electric guitar
Timothy May - acoustic guitar
Randy McCormick - keyboards, synthesizer
Norbert Putnam - bass guitar
Sarah Taylor - background vocals
Ernie Watts - flute

Charts

Weekly charts

Year-end charts

Singles

References

1979 albums
Eddie Rabbitt albums
Albums produced by David Malloy
Albums recorded at Capitol Studios
Albums recorded at Muscle Shoals Sound Studio
Elektra Records albums